Tabertown is an unincorporated community in Lost Creek Township, Vigo County, in the U.S. state of Indiana.

Now within the boundaries of the town of Seelyville, it is also part of the Terre Haute metropolitan area.

Geography

References

Unincorporated communities in Indiana
Unincorporated communities in Vigo County, Indiana
Terre Haute metropolitan area